Remix 3D was a website created by Microsoft for users to browse, distribute, and download 3D objects. The website featured a free library containing thousands of 3D objects for use in virtual reality and augmented reality applications. Remix 3D was released first to Windows Insiders and then as part of the Windows 10 Fall Creators Update, alongside Paint 3D. The service also directly integrated with and/or supported 3D Viewer, as well as Paint 3D, SketchUp, Minecraft, and PowerPoint.

In July 2019, Microsoft announced that it would be shutting down the Remix3D site on 10 January 2020. According to ZDNet, two months prior to the announcement, Microsoft Corporate Vice President Kudo Tsunoda, the person in charge of Microsoft's 3D efforts, left his job. Users are encouraged to store their creations to their Outlook.com account, instead.

See also
 Poly, a similar service by Google
 Facebook 3D Posts
 Sketchfab

References 

Microsoft websites
3D publishing